Hahncappsia sacculalis is a moth in the family Crambidae. It is found in Venezuela.

The wingspan is 19–22 mm.

References

Moths described in 1956
Pyraustinae